Falsohippopsicon is a genus of beetles in the family Cerambycidae, containing the following species:

 Falsohippopsicon albosternale Breuning, 1942
 Falsohippopsicon brunneum Breuning, 1956

References

Agapanthiini